The Jack Mytton Way is a long distance footpath and bridleway for horseriders, hillwalkers and mountain bikers in mid and south Shropshire, England. It typically takes a week to ride on horseback. 

For much of its length it passes through the Shropshire Hills AONB and includes parts of Wenlock Edge. It passes over the Clee Hills, and through the towns of Cleobury Mortimer, Church Stretton, Clun and Much Wenlock, passing close to Bridgnorth, Broseley and Highley. The south-west end is at Llanfair Waterdine. East of Roman Bank, it forms a loop.

It is named after John Mytton (1796–1834), also known as Mad Jack, a Shropshire landowner, MP, horseman, foxhunter, gambler and Regency rake.

References

External links 
 Ramblers' Association
 Shropshire Riding route information on each section
 photos along the Jack Mytton Way on geograph.org.uk

Footpaths in Shropshire
Long-distance footpaths in England
Bridleroutes in the United Kingdom